Martin Guntrip (born 18 July 1960) is a British former professional tennis player.

Guntrip, a native of Kent, was a varsity tennis player for Flagler College in Florida, earning NAIA All-American honours in 1981. While competing on the professional tour in the early 1980s he made doubles main draw appearances at Wimbledon. He is the current Director of the All England Lawn Tennis Club.

References

External links
 
 

1960 births
Living people
British male tennis players
English male tennis players
Tennis people from Kent
Flagler College alumni
College men's tennis players in the United States